David Murray, 5th Viscount of Stormont (1665 – 19 November 1731) was a Scottish peer. He was the son of David Murray, 4th Viscount Stormont (died 1668), and Jean Carnegie, daughter of James Carnegie, 2nd Earl of Southesk and Lady Mary Kerr. 

His family was Jacobite in its politics, most particularly his second son James (–1770).

Marriage and issue
On 31 January 1688, he married Marjory Scott (d. 8 April 1746), daughter of David Scott of Scotstarvit (d. 1718). The couple had the following children:
David Murray, 6th Viscount of Stormont ( –1748)
Hon. James Murray (–1770), Jacobite Earl of Dunbar
Hon. John Murray (died young)
William Murray, 1st Earl of Mansfield (1705–1793)
Hon. Catherine Murray (d. 25 November 1754), died unmarried
Hon. Marjory Murray, married Col. John Hay of Cromlix
Hon. Amelia Murray (d. 8 February 1774), married Sir Alexander Lindsay of Evelick, by whom she was mother to Margaret and John Lindsay.
Hon. Charles Murray, died without children
Hon. Robert Murray, died without children
Hon. Margaret ( – 18 April 1785), died without children
Hon. Jean Murray (d. 10 August 1758), unmarried
Hon. Nicola Helen Murray (d. 7 November 1777), died without children
Hon. Mary Murray, died unmarried

External links
Genealogical site, stirnet.com. Accessed 23 November 2022.

1665 births
1731 deaths
Viscounts in the Peerage of Scotland
Clan Murray